Royal Burgers' Zoo is a  zoo in Arnhem, Netherlands, and is one of the biggest zoos in the country. Arnhem is a city that lies within the Veluwe, a nature park in the east of the Netherlands. The zoo is popular with both Dutch and German people, and receives about 1 million visitors annually. It was founded by Johan Burgers in 1913.

The zoo is a member of the Dutch Zoo Federation (NVD), the European Association of Zoos and Aquaria (EAZA), the International Species Information System (ISIS), and the World Association of Zoos and Aquariums (WAZA).

Ecodisplays

The zoo has 8 theme sites called ecodisplays (ecological display):

 Burgers' Safari (a safari park).
 Burgers' Bush is a  indoor tropical rainforest.
 Burgers' Mangrove (a mangrove swamp). since July 2017: new 3,000 square meter mangrove hall
 Burgers' Desert is a  indoor desert (focusing on the Sonoran Desert).
 Burgers' Ocean is a  seawater aquarium. Two of the main tanks are the  ocean with sharks and other fish, and the  coral reef with tropical fish, living corals and other invertebrates.
 Burgers' Rimba (opened in 2008). The Rimba gives visitors an impression of a Southeast Asian rainforest. The animals in this display include Sumatran tigers, sun bears, binturongs, golden-cheeked gibbons, dusky leaf monkeys, Sri Lankan leopards, golden jackals, banteng, muntjac, hog deer, Eld's deer, siamang, pig-tailed macaque, reticulated python, and water monitor.

Playgrounds 
Burgers' Zoo knows two larger playgrounds and a smaller one.

The two larger playgrounds are located next to each other and connected through the Park Restaurant.

 Burgers' Avonturenland (the zoo's playground), opened in 2002).
 Burgers' Kids Jungle (Indoor playground in the theme of a South-American village, opened in 2012)

Conservation

Burgers’ Zoo has been successful enough in breeding fish and coral for their own aquarium that they can now help provide animals to other public aquariums. They use an artificial moon to stimulate sexual reproduction of corals in their reef, and also clone some 60 varieties.

Besides presenting many of its animals in simulated habitat in spacious indoors ecosystems, Burgers' Zoo also has facilities for conservation and captive breeding of animals nearly extinct. The Socorro dove (Zenaida graysoni) for example does not exist outside captivity at present; it was wiped out by introduced mammals on its home island. The species is being bred in Burgers' Zoo for eventual reintroduction into the wild.

Burgers' Zoo supports several nature conservation projects. The projects are small but with a big impact.

 Future For Nature Burgers' Zoo supports the Future For Nature Foundation. This foundation supports nature projects throughout the world, by awarding three cash prizes of 50,000 euros each year to three young, talented nature conservationists, so that they can continue their important nature conservation work. Every year the Future For Nature Awards are presented in Burgers' Zoo.
 Belize Burgers' Zoo protects a nature reserve with an area of 355 square kilometers, together with the Swiss animal park Papiliorama in Belize.
 Lucie Burgers Foundation Lucie Burgers Foundation encourages and facilitates comparative behavioral research in animals. The aim is to improve the knowledge about the natural behaviour of animals and about ecology.

References

External links 

 

Buildings and structures in Arnhem
Geography of Gelderland
Organisations based in the Netherlands with royal patronage
Tourist attractions in Gelderland
Zoos in the Netherlands